Centre  is a liberal political party in Croatia. The party was formed under the name Pametno  in Split in 2015 out of the citizens' initiative Za pametne ljude i pametan grad ("For smart people and a smart city"). The fundamental values endorsed by the party are the promotion of democracy, accountable and transparent management of public resources, civil proactive protection of fundamental human rights, economic development and environmental protection.

The Party's priorities are structural reforms, education and science, and it adheres to the values of "modern Western European countries". In November 2020, the party Pametno merged with the Dalija Orešković's Party with a First and Last Name to form a single party, called the Centre.

History

Pametno was founded in 2013 as citizens' initiative Za pametne ljude i pametan grad ("For smart people and a smart city") in the second most populous city in Croatia, Split, by computer scientist Marijana Puljak. In 2010, Puljak served as President of the Split City District of Žnjan which had around 6000 citizens. During her tenure, she achieved success by reviving social life in the district, launching the construction of a children's playground and obtaining a building permit for a new district school. In 2013, she founded the citizens' initiative, competed in the 2013 local elections and eventually, surprisingly, ended up winning 4 seats in the Split City Council.

In 2015, the citizens' initiative was transformed into a political party whose work was based on the principles of 'New people for a new policy', 'Science and education as the foundation of society' and 'Policies based on evidence'.

Pametno participated in the 2015 parliamentary election in the 10th electoral district but did not win any seats in the Parliament. In the 2016 extraordinary parliamentary election, the Party went national as part of the two-party "Turn Croatia Around" coalition, eventually coming in 7th in term of votes won, but winning no seats in the Parliament.

At the 2017 local elections, the Party nominated Marijana Puljak as its candidate for the position of the Mayor of Split. She eventually came in third and did not qualify for the second round. However, Pametno won 7 seats in the Split City Council; three more than the party had won at the previous election.

On 1 December 2017 the party was admitted into the Alliance of Liberals and Democrats for Europe as an affiliate member.

At the 2021 local elections, the Party candidate for the position of the Mayor of Split was Ivica Puljak. First round he ended first while in runoff he beat HDZ candidate Vice Mihanović. The Centre also won 7 out of 31 seats in the council, coming second.

Electoral results

Parliament (Sabor)
The following is a summary of the party's results in legislative elections for the Croatian Parliament. The "Votes won" and "Percentage" columns include sums of votes won by pre-election coalitions Pametno had been part of. The "Seats won" column includes sums of seats won by Pametno.

References

2015 establishments in Croatia
Political parties established in 2015
Liberal parties in Croatia
Centrist parties in Croatia
Pro-European political parties in Croatia
Organizations based in Split, Croatia